The Hull & Netherlands Steamship Co. Ltd. was formed in 1894 and brought together the shipping operations of CL Ringrose and WHH Hutchinson with the intention of concentrating their shipping services to that specific area of operation.

History

Overview
In the early 20th century the company encountered strong competition from other local companies serving the Humber ports and one of their main competitors Thomas Wilson Sons and Co. had set up a new joint venture in March 1906 with the North Eastern Railway Company called Wilson's & North Eastern Railway Shipping Co. Ltd rationalising their two operations and further strengthening the competition.

Hull & Netherlands launched new and upgraded vessels into their service in 1907 which provoked interest from the North Eastern Railway and in 1908 the company was taken over by the railway company and subsequently operated as a subsidiary within their group operations. In 1923 the North Eastern Railway and its subsidiaries were absorbed into the LNER as part of the rationalisation of the rail industry in the UK 

In 1935 it was agreed that the shipping services and port operations of the respective railway companies operating from and in the River Humber ports should be merged and the company was taken under the operating umbrella of Associated Humber Lines. It was the smallest of the four operations merged at that time and contributed just two ships to the new 30 ship joint operation.

Key dates
 1845 - The St. George Steam Packet Company of Liverpool commenced serving Antwerp and various Baltic Sea ports terminating at Saint Petersburg from Hull.
 1848 - The Hull Steam Packet Company was formed out of the earlier company.
 1894 - The Hull & Netherlands Steamship Co. Ltd. was formed by C.L. Ringrose and W.H.H. Hutchinson by merging the interests of the Hull Steam Packet Company and those of Hutchinson. The intention being to trade exclusively between Hull and the Netherlands.
 1907 - A major rebuilding plan was initiated with the building of four Abbey ships which had much greater and superior capacity.
 1908 - The North Eastern Railway (NER) took over the company, which then operated as a subsidiary of NER. Their interest having been intensified by the 1907 fleet developments. 
 1923 - The NER. became part of the London & North Eastern Railway.
 1935 - Associated Humber Lines was formed to rationalise the railway companies shipping services and port activity in the River Humber.

Routes
Hull to Netherlands.

Livery
Funnel : Buff with black top.
Hull : Black with red boot topping. Brown uppers and masts.

Passenger / cargo vessels operated

References

Bibliography
 
 

Transport in Kingston upon Hull
Shipping companies of England
Defunct shipping companies of the United Kingdom
Transport in Yorkshire